"Army of Hardcore" is a single by German hard dance band Scooter. It was released on 2 November 2012 as the second single from their sixteenth studio album Music for a Big Night Out.

Track listing 

CD Single (2-track) / Download

Other official versions
"Army of Hardcore" (BMG Remix) (4:53) on the deluxe edition of the band's seventeenth studio album The Fifth Chapter.

Credits and personnel 
Credits adapted from "Army of Hardcore" CD single liner notes.

Musicians & Producers
H.P. Baxxter a.k.a. 'Bass Junkie' – MC lyrics, producer, performer, programmer
Rick J. Jordan – mixer, engineer, producer, performer, programmer
Michael Simon – mixer, engineer, producer, performer, programmer
Marcel Jerome Gialelés (Jerome) – mixer, engineer

Business
Jens Thele – management

Packaging
Martin Weiland – artwork
Julia Dietrich – artwork
Christian Barz – photography

Chart performance

References

External links
 Scooter Official website

Scooter (band) songs
2012 singles
2012 songs